Mats Erik Johansson (26 December 1951 – 24 June 2017) was a Swedish journalist and politician. He was a member of the Moderate Party and served as a member of the Riksdag from 2006 to 2014. He was also a delegate in the Committee on Foreign Affairs and the War Delegation.

Johansson was a Delegate to The Parliamentary Assembly of The Council of Europe (PACE), Standing Rapporteur on Media Freedom, PACE, Member of the Board of The Public Service Companies Owner Foundation, and Chairman and founder of Stockholm Free World Forum, a foreign policy think-tank.

Prior to his election to office, Johansson was an editor for Svenska Dagbladet and Svensk Tidskrift.

Death
Johansson died on 24 June 2017 at the age of 65.

Former positions
Former positions include:

 Political Editor-in-Chief, Svenska Dagbladet (Leading Swedish Daily)
 Publisher/CEO, Timbro Free Market Institute
 Editor-in-Chief, The Swedish Business News Agency
 Correspondent, Washington, D. C.
 Member of The Boards of Directors, Swedish Radio, Swedish Television
 Member of The Public Committee for The Free Speech Constitution
 Member of The Public Committee for The Press Support System

Publications
 United States
 Baltic Liberation
 The Future of Europe
 Russia: The New Cold War

References

External links
 Riksdagen: Mats Johansson (m)
 www.matsjohansson.net (in Swedish)
 http://www.freeworldforum.org/

1951 births
2017 deaths
Members of the Riksdag from the Moderate Party
Recipients of the Order of the Cross of Terra Mariana, 3rd Class
People from Sundsvall